Acratodes is a genus of moths in the family Geometridae erected by Achille Guenée in 1857. It is considered a synonym of Xystrota by some sources.

Species
 Acratodes phakellurata Guenée, 1857
 Acratodes suavata (Hulst, 1900)
 Acratodes virgotus (Schaus)

References

Sterrhinae
Geometridae genera
Taxa named by Achille Guenée